Combridge is a small settlement in Staffordshire, England. It is near the town of Uttoxeter. For population details as taken at the 2011 census see Rocester.

Villages in Staffordshire